St. John's Historic District is a national historic district located at Darlington, Darlington County, South Carolina.  The district encompasses 55 contributing buildings and 1 contributing site in a mixed residential section of Darlington.  The focal point of the district is St. John's School complex and campus, the Academy Green. The properties in the district are located in approximately five block area of oak lined streets. Approximately 75 percent of the buildings were constructed prior to 1925. Most of them were built between 1880 and 1925 during a period of unprecedented agricultural prosperity and reflect the architectural characteristics of that era, including Queen Anne, Neo-Classical, Colonial Revival, and Bungalow. Notable buildings include Central Baptist Church, Darlington County Library, St. John's
High School, St. John's Elementary School, Open-Air Theatre, Haynesworth House, L. S. Welling House, and Trinity Methodist Episcopal Church.

It was listed on the National Register of Historic Places in 1980.

References

Historic districts on the National Register of Historic Places in South Carolina
Queen Anne architecture in South Carolina
Colonial Revival architecture in South Carolina
Neoclassical architecture in South Carolina
Historic districts in Darlington County, South Carolina
National Register of Historic Places in Darlington County, South Carolina
Darlington, South Carolina